The tornado outbreak of April 1–2, 1974, affected much of the eastern and central United States. Four fatalities and more than seventy injuries were confirmed in this outbreak. Damaging, deadly tornadoes struck Kentucky, Tennessee, and Alabama—including the Nashville and Huntsville metropolitan areas. In the latter areas, tornadoes produced F3 damage on the Fujita scale and impacted areas that would later sustain damage on April 3. Large hail and severe thunderstorm winds also impacted a broad area.

Background
The outbreak began when a powerful area of low pressure formed across the Great Plains on April 1 and moved into Mississippi and Ohio Valleys. As it did, a surge of very moist warm air intensified the storm. As a result, a series of tornado outbreaks occurred. The outbreak produced 23 confirmed tornadoes, three of which caused at least one fatality. The outbreak ended approximately 30 hours before the Super Outbreak of 1974 began. The National Weather Service (NWS) issued a total of 11 severe weather watches on April 1 alone. These watches, along with the damage and deaths that followed, prompted alertness among the general public that may have reduced casualties and losses during the larger outbreak of April 3 to April 4. According to the NWS, the severe weather on April 1 spurred appropriate protective measures a few days later, and consequently "many lives were saved."

Confirmed tornadoes

Non-tornadic effects
Peak wind gusts reached  in the strongest thunderstorms, over Daviess County, Kentucky.

See also
 1974 Super Outbreak – Second largest outbreak in American history, after the 2011 Super Outbreak
 List of tornadoes and tornado outbreaks
 List of North American tornadoes and tornado outbreaks
 Tornadoes of 1974

Notes

References

F3 tornadoes
Tornadoes in Mississippi
Tornadoes in Arkansas
Tornadoes in Illinois
Tornadoes in Indiana
Tornadoes in Alabama
Tornadoes in Michigan
Tornadoes in Louisiana
Tornadoes in Kentucky
Tornadoes in Tennessee
Tornadoes in Ohio
Tornadoes in North Carolina
1974 natural disasters in the United States
1974 in Mississippi
1974 in Alabama
Tornadoes of 1974
April 1974 events in the United States